The 2005–06 season of the Pro D2 (the second French domestic rugby union club competition)  ran from August 2005 to June 2006.

The top two teams gained promotion to the Top 14 whilst the bottom three teams were relegated to Fédérale 1.

Standings

See also
 2005-06 Top 14

External links
 LNR.fr
 Table

2005–06
Pro D2